Ladd or Ladds may refer to:

People
Ladd (surname)
Brent Ladds (born 1951), Canadian ice hockey administrator

Places
In the United States
Ladds, Georgia, an unincorporated community
Ladd, Illinois, village 
Ladd, Missouri, an unincorporated community
Ladd, Virginia, village

Other
Ladd's Addition, a neighborhood of Portland, Oregon, United States
Ladd Arboretum, arboretum in Evanston, Illinois, United States
Ladd Army Airfield, military airfield at Fort Jonathan Wainwright, Fairbanks, Alaska, United States
LADD Furniture, now part of La-Z-Boy
Ladd Observatory, astronomical observatory of Brown University, Providence, Rhode Island, United States
Ladd's cordials, soft drink company in Adelaide, South Australia
The Ladd Company, film production and distribution company

ru:Лэдд